Conan of the Red Brotherhood is a fantasy novel by American writer Leonard Carpenter featuring Robert E. Howard's  sword and sorcery hero Conan the Barbarian. It was first published in paperback by Tor Books in February 1993, and reprinted in 1998.

Plot
From a fortress on the island of Djafur, Conan (using his alias as Amra the Lion) builds the piratical Red Brotherhood into a virtual naval empire on the Vilayet Sea. In one raid, Conan accidentally rescues Philiope, a nobleman's daughter, who in time threatens his romantic interests towards Olivia (a holdover from the previous story, "Shadows in the Moonlight"). However, Amra's activities present a major challenge for the region's dominant power, the empire of Turan. In the capital of Aghrapur, Emperor Yildiz, his son Yezdigerd, and their underlings plan on destroying his forces. Their wizards come up with various obstacles including a steam engine, zombie-manned ships, centipede-like creatures, and a huge monster from the depths of the sea. Conan, however, emerges triumphant with each encounter.

Reception
Reviewer Don D'Ammassa rates the novel as "[s]lightly above average for the author."

References

External links
Page at Fantastic Fiction

1993 American novels
1993 fantasy novels
Conan the Barbarian novels
Novels by Leonard Carpenter
American fantasy novels
Tor Books books